Vidal Vicente Nuño [vee-dahl' nooh'-nio] (born July 26, 1987) is an American professional baseball pitcher for the Acereros de Monclova of the Mexican League. He has played in Major League Baseball (MLB) for the New York Yankees, Arizona Diamondbacks, Seattle Mariners, Baltimore Orioles, and Tampa Bay Rays. The Cleveland Indians selected Nuño in the 48th round of the 2009 Major League Baseball draft. He made his MLB debut in 2013 with the Yankees.

Amateur career
Nuño attended Sweetwater High School in National City, California, where he played for the school's baseball team. As a junior, in 2004, Nuño recorded 107 strikeouts and was named the Mesa League Pitcher of the Year.

Due to his poor academic track record, Nuño could not receive a scholarship from a Division I school. Wanting to leave the San Diego metropolitan area, he attended Baker University in Baldwin City, Kansas, where he played college baseball for the Baker Wildcats in the National Association of Intercollegiate Athletics. In two seasons at Baker, Nuño had a 15–7 win–loss record. He was named the Heart of America Athletic Conference Pitcher of the Year as a junior in 2008.

Professional career

Cleveland Indians
The Cleveland Indians selected Nuño in the 48th round of the 2009 Major League Baseball draft, with the 1,445th overall selection. That year, he pitched for the Mahoning Valley Scrappers of the Class A-Short Season New York–Pennsylvania League. He began the season as a relief pitcher, but was moved into the starting rotation. He finished the season with a 2.05 earned run average (ERA). In 2010, Nuño was promoted to the Lake County Captains of the Class A Midwest League. After pitching to a 4.96 ERA in 21 games, the Indians released Nuño on March 26, 2011, and suggested that in order to continue his career, he should develop a changeup.

Washington Wild Things
Nuño began the 2011 season pitching in independent baseball for the Washington Wild Things of the Frontier League, where he worked on his changeup. In six games with the Wild Things, Nuño recorded a 2.83 ERA with 34 strikeouts.

New York Yankees
On June 18, 2011, Nuño signed with the New York Yankees organization, and was assigned to the Staten Island Yankees of the New York–Penn League. He also pitched for the Charleston RiverDogs of the Class A South Atlantic League. In 2012, Nuño played for the Tampa Yankees of the Class A-Advanced Florida State League and Trenton Thunder of the Class AA Eastern League. Across both levels, Nuño pitched to a 10–6 win–loss record with a 2.54 ERA, the best among all Yankees' minor league pitchers, across  innings pitched.

The Yankees invited Nuño to spring training in 2013. He won the James P. Dawson Award as the best rookie in camp. Assigned to the Scranton/Wilkes-Barre RailRiders of the Class AAA International League, he was named the league's pitcher of the week for the week ending April 21, after he won both of his starts, allowing one run in  innings, with two walks and 14 strikeouts.

With Iván Nova on the disabled list, the Yankees promoted Nuño to the major leagues on April 27, 2013. He made his major league debut on April 29, pitching three scoreless innings in relief. On May 13, he made his second appearance, his first major league start, in the second game of a doubleheader against the Cleveland Indians. Nuño pitched five scoreless innings and got his first career win. The next day, the Yankees optioned Nuño to Scranton/Wilkes-Barre to activate Curtis Granderson from the disabled list.

On May 17, 2013, Nuño was recalled back to the New York Yankees MLB roster, following an injury to Andy Pettitte that forced him to the 15-day disabled list. In a relief outing against the Baltimore Orioles on May 21, he recorded his first major league loss after surrendering a lead-off home run to Nate McLouth in the 10th inning. He was again optioned to Scranton/Wilkes-Barre on May 30, 2013. Nuño was placed on the disabled list in June and missed the remainder of the 2013 season.

Nuño competed with Michael Pineda, David Phelps, and Adam Warren for the final spot in the Yankees' starting rotation during spring training in 2014. Pineda won the final spot, and Nuño made the Yankees' Opening Day roster as a relief pitcher. After pitching in relief in three games, Nuño made his first start of the 2014 season on April 20. Nuño started 14 games for the Yankees, going 2–5 while allowing up 15 home runs in 78 innings.

Arizona Diamondbacks
On July 6, 2014, Nuño was traded to the Diamondbacks for pitcher Brandon McCarthy. Nuño pitched to a 3.74 ERA as a member of the Diamondbacks' starting rotation, but did not win a game in 14 starts, going 0–7 with the Diamondbacks and finishing the year with a win–loss record of 2–12 and a 4.56 ERA in 28 starts. Nuno began the 2015 season with the Reno Aces of the Class AAA Pacific Coast League. He was promoted to the majors on May 11 and made one appearance before he was optioned to Reno on May 16.

Seattle Mariners

On June 3, 2015, the Diamondbacks traded Nuño and Mark Trumbo to the Seattle Mariners for catcher Welington Castillo, reliever Dominic Leone and prospects Gabby Guerrero and Jack Reinheimer. Nuño pitched to a 1-4 record with a 5.08 ERA in ten games started, and a 1.91 ERA in 25 appearances as a relief pitcher. When he won a start on September 9, it was his first major league victory since June 27, 2014, and he broke a string of 44 appearances and 20 starts without a win; his 20-start winless streak had been tied for the longest active streak without a win in the major league's with Atlanta's Shelby Miller.

In 2016, the Mariners determined that they would use Nuño solely as a relief pitcher. In 56 appearances, including one
start, he posted a 3.53 ERA in  innings.

Baltimore Orioles

On November 6, 2016, the Mariners traded Nuño to the Los Angeles Dodgers for catcher Carlos Ruiz. Nuño and the Dodgers avoided salary arbitration on January 10, 2017, by agreeing to a one-year, $1.125 million contract. On February 19, 2017, he was traded to the Baltimore Orioles for minor league pitcher Ryan Moseley. He elected free agency on October 1, 2017.

Tampa Bay Rays
On November 7, 2017, Nuno signed a minor league deal with the Tampa Bay Rays. He began the 2018 season with the Durham Bulls of the International League, and was promoted to the major leagues in May. Nuno ended the season with an earned run average of 1.64 in 33 innings (17 appearances) out of the bullpen. He threw a slider 67.0% of the time, tops in MLB.

Washington Nationals
On January 17, 2019, Nuño signed a minor league contract with the Washington Nationals that included an invitation to spring training. He was released on May 27, 2019.

Second stint with Rays
On June 3, 2019, the Rays signed Nuño to a minor league deal. He became a free agent following the 2019 season.

Toros de Tijuana
On February 18, 2020, Nuño signed with the Toros de Tijuana of the Mexican League. Nuño did not play in a game in 2020 due to the cancellation of the Mexican League season because of the COVID-19 pandemic. Nuño recorded 11 scoreless innings in 2021 for Tijuana.

Los Angeles Dodgers
On June 1, 2021, Nuño signed a minor league contract with the Los Angeles Dodgers organization. He pitched in 18 games (seven starts) for the AAA Oklahoma City Dodgers, with a 6–2 record and a 7.09 ERA.

Toros de Tijuana (second stint)
On February 28, 2022, Nuño signed with the Toros de Tijuana of the Mexican League. Nuño made seven appearances for Tijuana in 2022, logging a 1.35 ERA with 6 strikeouts in 6.2 innings pitched. On January 23, 2023, Nuño was released by Tijuana.

Acereros de Monclova
On March 8, 2023, Nuño signed with the Acereros de Monclova of the Mexican League.

International career
He was selected Mexico national baseball team at the 2017 World Baseball Classic.

On October 29, 2018, he was selected as a member of the MLB All-Stars in the 2018 MLB Japan All-Star Series.

References

External links

1987 births
Living people
Águilas de Mexicali players
Águilas del Zulia players
American expatriate baseball players in Venezuela

American baseball players of Mexican descent
Arizona Diamondbacks players
Arizona League Indians players
Baker Wildcats baseball players
Baltimore Orioles players
Baseball players from California
Charleston RiverDogs players
Durham Bulls players
Fresno Grizzlies players
People from National City, California
Lake County Captains players
Major League Baseball pitchers
Mahoning Valley Scrappers players
Mexican League baseball pitchers
New York Yankees players
Norfolk Tides players
Oklahoma City Dodgers players
Reno Aces players
Scottsdale Scorpions players
Scranton/Wilkes-Barre RailRiders players
Seattle Mariners players
Staten Island Yankees players
Tacoma Rainiers players
Tampa Bay Rays players
Tampa Yankees players
Toros de Tijuana players
Trenton Thunder players
Washington Wild Things players
2017 World Baseball Classic players